This is a list of all extant genera, species and subspecies of the family Uropeltidae, otherwise referred to as uropeltids, shield tail snakes or earth snakes. It follows the taxonomy currently provided by ITIS, which is based on the continuing work of Roy McDiarmid.

 Melanophidium
 Melanophidium bilineatum, two-lined black shield tail snake
 Melanophidium punctatum, Beddome's black shield tail snake
 Melanophidium wynaudense, Indian black earth snake
 Platyplectrurus
 Platyplectrurus madurensis, Travancore Hills thorntail snake
 Platyplectrurus madurensis madurensis
 Platyplectrurus madurensis ruhanae
 Platyplectrurus trilineatus, tri-striped shield tail snake
 Plectrurus
 Plectrurus aureus, golden shield tail snake
 Plectrurus guentheri, Günther's burrowing snake
 Plectrurus perrotetii, Perrotet's shield tail snake
 Pseudoplectrurus
 Pseudoplectrurus canaricus, Karnataka burrowing snake
 Rhinophis
 Rhinophis blythii, Blyth's earth snake
 Rhinophis dorsimaculatus, polka-dot earth snake
 Rhinophis drummondhayi, Drummond-Hay's earth snake
 Rhinophis fergusonianus, Cardamom Hills earth snake
 Rhinophis homolepis, Trevelyan's earth snake
 Rhinophis oxyrynchus, Schneider's earth snake
 Rhinophis philippinus, Peter's earth snake
 Rhinophis porrectus, Willey's earth snake
 Rhinophis punctatus, Müller's earth snake
 Rhinophis saffragamus, large shield tail snake
 Rhinophis sanguineus, salty earth snake
 Rhinophis travancoricus, Travancore shield tail snake
 Rhinophis tricolorata
 Teretrurus
 Teretrurus hewstoni
 Teretrurus rhodogaster, Wall's shield tail snake
 Teretrurus sanguineus, purple-red earth snake
 Teretrurus travancoricus, Travancore earth snake
 Uropeltis
 Uropeltis arcticeps, Tinevelly shield tail snake
 Uropeltis beddomii, Beddom's shield tail snake
 Uropeltis broughami, Sirumallay's shield tail snake
 Uropeltis ceylanica, Cuvier's shield tail snake
 Uropeltis dindigalensis, Dindigul shield tail snake
 Uropeltis ellioti, Elliot's shield tail snake
 Uropeltis grandis, Smith's shield tail snake
 Uropeltis liura, Günther's shield tail snake
 Uropeltis macrolepis, Bombay shield tail snake
 Uropeltis macrorhyncha, Ponachi shield tail snake
 Uropeltis maculata, spotted shield tail snake
 Uropeltis melanogaster, Gray's shield tail snake
 Uropeltis myhendrae, barred shield tail snake
 Uropeltis nitida, Cochin shield tail snake
 Uropeltis ocellata, Nilgiri shield tail snake
 Uropeltis petersi, Peters' shield tail snake
 Uropeltis phillipsi, Phillips' shield tail snake
 Uropeltis phipsonii, Phipson's shield tail snake
 Uropeltis pulneyensis, Palni shiled tail snake
 Uropeltis rubrolineata, red-lined shield tail snake
 Uropeltis rubromaculata, red-spotted shield tail snake
 Uropeltis ruhunae
 Uropeltis woodmasoni, black-bellied shield tail snake

References

 
Uropeltidae
Uropeltidae